Cyperus macer is a species of sedge that is native to parts of South East Asia.

See also 
 List of Cyperus species

References 

macer
Plants described in 1884
Flora of Bangladesh
Flora of Myanmar
Flora of Assam (region)
Taxa named by Charles Baron Clarke